In astronomy, a green star is a white or blueish star that appears greenish in some viewing conditions (see § Psychology below). Under typical viewing conditions, there are no greenish stars, because the color of a star is more or less given by a black-body spectrum. However, there are a few stars that appear greenish to some observers, due to the viewing conditions, for example the optical 'illusion' that a red object can make nearby objects look greenish (and vice versa). Some multiple star systems, such as Antares, have a bright reddish or yellowish star where this contrast makes other stars in the system seem greenish.

Psychology of color perception 

Color is not a fundamental property, it is in the brain of the observer. As such, no star really has any colour at all. Stars emit energy at many different wavelengths, and humans may perceive color in stars. Instead of talking about the 'true' color of stars, we must talk about how a particular object appears to a particular observer, in a particular context.

This issue is not mere semantics: Green can be perceived when there is no 'green' light at all - for example due to the simultaneous colour contrast alluded to above, in that a star can look greenish when it is next to a reddish star (likewise, the reddish star will appear more red when next to a non-reddish star). Green percepts can also be created by blocking red light, and by adapting the 'red' photoreceptors (see complementary colors). This is not an 'illusion', this is simply how humans perceive colour.

The perception of colour in stars is complicated by the fact that the cone photoreceptors, from which colour percepts are typically generated, are not active during the dim lighting conditions required to see most stars without magnification - that is, in scotopic vision. Further, stars are effectively single points of light at vast distances from the observer's eye; this light is filtered through the atmosphere, through pollution, through the eye and the brain. It is only because starlight is split, scattered, and/or because the observer's eye is always moving, that the light from a star can stimulate multiple photoreceptors in the retina, and therefore generate percepts of colour, relative to the background illumination.

Why stars do not look green

A star is usually close to being a black body, give or take a few spectral lines, so its color is usually more or less the color of a black body. The color of a black body lies on the Planckian locus in the middle of the diagram shown here. As can be seen, this locus happens to pass through red, orange, yellow, white, and light blue areas, and one can indeed see many stars of these colors. On the other hand, it does not pass through green, indigo (dark blue) or violet areas, so stars that appear to have these colors are rare and depend on some additional optical effect.

The (black body) colors of stars are sometimes confused with the colors of the spectrum. The spectral (rainbow) colors are those on the curved part of the boundary of the diagram on the right. As can be seen, the red, orange, yellow and blue rainbow colors happen to be much the same as black body colors, which range from pale cyan, to white, to yellow, to orange. However, stars whose peak emission is green light (around 6000K, similar to the Sun) also emit a great deal of both red and blue light, and the human visual system interprets this mixture of colors as whitish rather than green.

So the fact that some spectral colors appear as star colors is more a quirk of human color vision than a property of stars: If one uses an instrument such as a spectroscope that is better at distinguishing wavelengths of light, then the separated spectral colors look different from the composite colors of stars.

All sufficiently hot stars look about the same shade of blue (and not violet as claimed in some popular accounts). The reason for this is that at sufficiently large temperatures (above about 20,000 K) all black body spectra look about the same in visible light, though they can differ a lot at shorter wavelengths. Although their maximum output at visible wavelengths is at violet, they put out enough light at other wavelengths to look light blue: The color at the end of the Planckian locus rather than the color at the end of the spectrum.

Objects that resemble green stars
Although there are no truly green stars, there are many astronomical objects that can sometimes appear to be green stars. This section lists some of them.

Beta Librae 

The star Beta Librae (Zubeneschamali,  Lib) is usually described as appearing white to modern observers, viewed through modern telescopes. However its color is controversial, and many earlier observers stated that they saw it as green. There seems to be no consensus about what its color really is, and no generally accepted explanation for why some observers would have seen it as green.

Multiple stars

There are a few stars in double or multiple star systems that appear greenish, even though they are blue or white under typical viewing conditions. This can happen if the star system contains a large red or orange star. Colour contrast effects result in objects close to the reddish star appear slightly greenish (and vice versa: complementary colors).

Antares
The classical example is Antares (Alpha Scorpii or  Sco), the brightest star in the constellation Scorpius: The primary of the double star system is the red supergiant primary  Sco A; it has a blue companion  Sco B. When viewed at low-enough power so that the light of the two stars is seen combined, some observers describe the color as greenish.

Almach
Other examples include the star system Almach (¹ and ² Andromedae) a golden-yellow star next to a dimmer, indigo-blue star about 350 light years away.

 Cassiopeiae
Another is the sigma Cassiopeiae ( Cas) star system, a binary star 1,500 light-years from Earth.  Cas‑A is a greenish-hued magnitude 5.0 primary, next to magnitude 7.3 blue-hued secondary  Cas‑B.

Planetary nebulae
Some planetary nebulae themselves glow with the green O emission lines, especially if the nebula is enriched oxygen, well irradiated by its central late-stage star or white dwarf. These nebulae, or the stars within them (usually bluish or white Wolf-Rayet stars) may appear to be green when viewed in combination at low power.
Some examples are the planetary nebulas NGC 6572, NGC 6826, and NGC 7009.

Uranus

The planet Uranus occasionally appeared in ancient star catalogs, and in more recent catalogs before William Herschel discovered it is a planet – most recently  as 34 Tauri in Flamsteed's catalog. It appears as a small greenish dot in binoculars. The color is from its cold methane atmosphere.

The Sun

The Sun can sometimes appear as a green spot for a second or two as it is rising or setting: this is known as green flash. Roughly speaking, the red light from the Sun is blocked by Earth, the blue light is scattered by the atmosphere, and the green light is refracted by the atmosphere to the observer.

A similar effect can occasionally be seen with other astronomical objects such as the moon and bright planets.

Furthermore, the Sun emits more green photons than any other color; i.e. it peaks in the green part of the visible spectrum.

False color images
Astronomical images are sometimes printed in false colors, which can make stars look green.

See also
Spectral classification

References

Sources

External links
 

Stars
Optical illusions